Tyler Shaw (born April 8, 1993) is a Canadian singer and actor. After winning the "MuchMusic Coca-Cola Covers Contest 2012" organized by the Canadian music cable channel MuchMusic, he released his debut single, "Kiss Goodnight", through Sony Music Canada in December 2012. The song was certified Gold by Music Canada in April 2013. His debut studio album, Yesterday, was released on September 4, 2015, by Sony Music. His second album Intuition was released on September 28, 2018, also by Sony Music.

Early life
Tyler Shaw was born in Richmond, British Columbia and raised in Coquitlam, British Columbia. He is of Chinese, Polish, and Ukrainian descent; his father was an immigrant from Hong Kong. Shaw has an older brother, Matthew Shaw, who is a professional actor. He played competitive soccer for many years of his childhood.

Musical career

2012–2017: Career beginnings and Yesterday
Shaw's debut single, "Kiss Goodnight", was co-written by Shaw with Stephen Kozmeniuk and Todd Clark, and was produced by Koz and Zubin Thakkar. The single rose on the Canadian radio charts and soon after became Shaw's first gold certified single, peaking at 24 on the Canadian Hot 100. The follow up, "By My Side" was released as Shaw's second official single in June 2013. He released "It Happens All the Time" in 2014 and the single "House of Cards" in 2015. Shaw released his debut studio album Yesterday  on September 4, 2015 to critical acclaim. In January 2016, Shaw released "Wicked"; the song was later certified gold.

To support his debut album, Tyler toured across Canada with Selena Gomez for her Revival World Tour in 2016. He also performed as a supporting act for Canadian artists Shawn Mendes and Alessia Cara. Shaw has performed for the 23rd Prime Minister of Canada, Justin Trudeau and Prince Harry, Duke of Sussex at the Invictus Games in May 2017.

2018–present: Intuition and Tyler Shaw 
In December 2017, Shaw released the Christmas single "Silent Night", which was serviced to Canadian radio. He performed the song on CTV's Santa Claus Parade in November 2018, along with The Canadian Tenors and Johnny Orlando. The lead single from Shaw's second album was "Cautious", which was released in January 2018. The single reached top 10 at Canadian radio and was certified gold.

His second studio album, Intuition (stylized in all caps) was released on September 28, 2018, by Sony Music Canada. Shaw performed at various iHeartRadio venues to promote the album.

"With You", became the second single from Tyler’s sophomore album. The single is certified double platinum, and reached the top 5 on the Canadian radio charts and as peaked at #34 on the Canadian Billboard Hot 100 chart.  The single reached #1 twice on the French BDS charts with the French duet version featuring French singer Sara Diamond. Tyler’s album INTUITION received a Juno Awards nomination for Pop Album of the Year in January 2019 and landed him a performance slot of the national broadcast of the Canadian awards show in March 2019 where he performed an acoustic rendition of "With You".

The third and final single from the album, "To The Man Who Let Her Go", was released in May 2019 and reached the top 10 across 3 Canadian radio formats. The single is officially certified gold and the official music video, shot by The Young Astronauts, reached #1 on the Canadian iTunes music video chart. According to BDS / Nielsen Soundscan, Tyler’s single "With You" was the most played single at Canadian radio by a Canadian artist.

In addition to writing, performing and producing music for his own project, Tyler has also produced and co-wrote songs for other artists including Ross Lynch, Victoria Duffield, Justin Tyler, Ryland James and Olivia Lunny. Tyler's self-titled third studio album was released on August 20, 2021.

In 2023, he participated in an all-star recording of Serena Ryder's single "What I Wouldn't Do", which was released as a charity single to benefit Kids Help Phone's Feel Out Loud campaign for youth mental health.

Tours
 The Wanted Tour with Neon Dreams and Craig Stickland – 2019
 The Intuition Tour with Ryland James and Sara Diamond – 2018
 Selena Gomez – Revival World Tour – 2015

Acting career
Shaw made his acting debut in the 2017 Canadian independent film The Meaning of Life, directed by Cat Hostick. He also appeared in the episode "Dancing in the Rain" on the Canadian drama series Lost & Found Music Studios.

Brand endorsements and modeling
In February 2020, Tyler announced via his social media that he had officially signed with Sutherland Models, one of Canada's premiere modeling agencies. In March 2020, the single "With You" was featured in a national commercial for Rogers 5G network. The commercial featured Tyler as a live performer. In a partnership with Rogers Tyler also had an interactive live hologram activation at the Rogers 302 flagship store in downtown Toronto, which performed some of his biggest hits.

Philanthropy and supported causes

Tyler performed at the WE Organization's WE DAY events and helped build a school in Kenya. Tyler has also participated in initiatives like Bell Let’s Talk and smaller community events that focus on raising awareness and eliminating stigmas associated with mental illness.

In April 2020, Shaw co-created the artists initiative ArtistsCAN to help raise funds for the Canadian Red Cross for COVID-19 relief.

Personal life
Shaw married Alex Karolczyk (born July 13, 1989) on August 18, 2018 after six years of dating. They welcomed their first child, a daughter named Everly, on December 20, 2020.

Discography

Studio albums

Singles

As lead artist

As featured artist

Promotional singles

Christmas singles

References

External links

Facebook

1993 births
Living people
21st-century Canadian guitarists
21st-century Canadian male actors
21st-century Canadian male singers
Canadian male actors of Chinese descent
Canadian male film actors
Canadian male guitarists
Canadian male singers
Canadian male television actors
Canadian musicians of Chinese descent
Canadian people of Polish descent
Canadian people of Ukrainian descent
Canadian philanthropists
Canadian pop guitarists
Canadian pop singers
Male actors from British Columbia
Musicians from British Columbia
People from Coquitlam
People from Richmond, British Columbia